Gigi Fernández and Natasha Zvereva were the defending champions but did not compete that year.

Jana Novotná and Arantxa Sánchez Vicario won in the final 6–2, 6–0 against Manon Bollegraf and Helena Suková.

Seeds
Champion seeds are indicated in bold text while text in italics indicates the round in which those seeds were eliminated. The top four seeded teams received byes into the second round.

Draw

Final

Top half

Bottom half

External links
 1994 Virginia Slims of Florida Doubles Draw

Virginia Slims of Florida
1994 WTA Tour